Ceratotherium neumayri is a fossil species of rhinoceros from the eastern Mediterranean, in the Anatolia region in modern Turkey, dating to the late Miocene. It is the likely ancestor of both the white rhinoceros and black rhinoceros lineages of Africa. A well-preserved sample fossil of the species, which is believed to have died of high temperatures during a volcanic eruption, has been found in Gülşehir, Turkey on 2012.

References

Miocene rhinoceroses
Miocene mammals of Asia
Fossil taxa described in 1988